Hearst Communications, Inc., often referred to simply as Hearst, is an American multinational mass media and business information conglomerate based in Hearst Tower in Midtown Manhattan in New York City.

Hearst owns newspapers, magazines, television channels, and television stations, including the San Francisco Chronicle, the Houston Chronicle, Cosmopolitan and Esquire. It owns 50% of the A&E Networks cable network group and 20% of the sports cable network group ESPN, both in partnership with The Walt Disney Company. It also owns 50% of Complex Networks in partnership with Verizon.

The conglomerate also owns several business-information companies, including Fitch Ratings and First Databank.

The company was founded by William Randolph Hearst as an owner of newspapers, and the Hearst family remains involved in its ownership and management.

History

The formative years 
In 1880, George Hearst, mining entrepreneur and U.S. senator, bought the San Francisco Daily Examiner. In 1887, he turned the Examiner over to his son, William Randolph Hearst, who that year founded the Hearst Corporation. The younger Hearst eventually built readership for Hearst-owned newspapers and magazines from 15,000 to over 20 million. Hearst began to purchase and launched other newspapers, including the New York Journal in 1895 and the Los Angeles Examiner in 1903.

In 1903, Hearst created Motor magazine, the first title in his company's magazine division. He acquired Cosmopolitan in 1905, and Good Housekeeping in 1911. The company entered the book publishing business in 1913 with the formation of Hearst's International Library. Hearst began producing film features in the mid-1910s, creating one of the earliest animation studios: the International Film Service, turning characters from Hearst newspaper strips into film characters.

Hearst bought the Atlanta Georgian in 1912, the San Francisco Call and the San Francisco Post in 1913, the Boston Advertiser and the Washington Times (unrelated to the present-day paper) in 1917, and the Chicago Herald in 1918 (resulting in the Herald-Examiner).

In 1919, Hearst's book publishing division was renamed Cosmopolitan Book.

The peak era 

In the 1920s and 1930s, Hearst owned the biggest media conglomerate in the world, which included a number of magazines and newspapers in major cities. Hearst also began acquiring radio stations to complement his papers. Hearst saw financial challenges in the early 1920s, when he was using company funds to build Hearst Castle in San Simeon and support movie production at Cosmopolitan Productions. This eventually led to the merger of the magazine Hearst International with Cosmopolitan in 1925.

Despite some financial troubles, Hearst began extending its reach in 1921, purchasing the Detroit Times, The Boston Record, and the Seattle Post-Intelligencer. Hearst then added the Los Angeles Herald and Washington Herald, as well as the Oakland Post-Enquirer, the Syracuse Telegram and the Rochester Journal-American in 1922. He continued his buying spree into the mid-1920s, purchasing the Baltimore News (1923), the San Antonio Light (1924), the Albany Times Union (1924), and The Milwaukee Sentinel (1924). In 1924, Hearst entered the tabloid market in New York City with New York Daily Mirror, meant to compete with the New York Daily News.

In addition to print and radio, Hearst established Cosmopolitan Pictures in the early 1920s, distributing his films under the newly created Metro Goldwyn Mayer. In 1929, Hearst and MGM created the Hearst Metrotone newsreels.

Retrenching after the Great Depression 
The Great Depression hurt Hearst and his publications. Cosmopolitan Book was sold to Farrar & Rinehart in 1931. After two years of leasing them to Eleanor "Cissy" Patterson (of the McCormick-Patterson family that owned the Chicago Tribune), Hearst sold her The Washington Times and Herald in 1939; she merged them to form the Washington Times-Herald. That year he also bought the Milwaukee Sentinel from Paul Block (who bought it from the Pfisters in 1929), absorbing his afternoon Wisconsin News into the morning publication. Also in 1939, he sold the Atlanta Georgian to Cox Newspapers, which merged it with the Atlanta Journal.

Following Adolf Hitler's rise to power in Germany, the Nazis received positive press coverage by Hearst presses and paid ten times the standard subscription rate for the INS wire service belonging to Hearst. William Randolph Hearst personally instructed his reporters in Germany to only give positive coverage to Hitler and the Nazis, and fired journalists who refused to write stories favourable of German fascism. During this time, high ranking Nazis were given space to write articles in Hearst press newspapers, including Hermann Göring and Alfred Rosenberg.

Hearst, with his chain now owned by his creditors after a 1937 liquidation, also had to merge some of his morning papers into his afternoon papers. In Chicago, he combined the morning Herald-Examiner and the afternoon American into the Herald-American in 1939. This followed the 1937 combination of the New York Evening Journal and the morning American into the New York Journal-American, the sale of the Omaha Daily Bee to the World-Herald.

Afternoon papers were a profitable business in pre-television days, often outselling their morning counterparts featuring stock market information in early editions, while later editions were heavy on sporting news with results of baseball games and horse races. Afternoon papers also benefited from continuous reports from the battlefront during World War II. After the war, however, both television news and suburbs experienced explosive growth; thus, evening papers were more affected than those published in the morning, whose circulation remained stable while their afternoon counterparts' sales plummeted.

In 1947, Hearst produced an early television newscast for the DuMont Television Network: I.N.S. Telenews, and in 1948 he became the owner of one of the first television stations in the country, WBAL-TV in Baltimore.

The earnings of Hearst's three morning papers, the San Francisco Examiner, the Los Angeles Examiner, and The Milwaukee Sentinel, supported the company's money-losing afternoon publications such as the Los Angeles Herald-Express, the New York Journal-American, and the Chicago American. The company sold the latter paper in 1956 to the Chicago Tribunes owners, who changed it to the tabloid-size Chicago Today in 1969 and ceased publication in 1974. In 1960, Hearst also sold the Pittsburgh Sun-Telegraph to the Pittsburgh Post-Gazette and the Detroit Times to The Detroit News. After a lengthy strike it sold the Milwaukee Sentinel to the afternoon Milwaukee Journal in 1962. The same year Hearst's Los Angeles papers – the morning Examiner and the afternoon Herald-Express – merged to become the evening Los Angeles Herald-Examiner. The 1962-63 New York City newspaper strike left the city with no papers for over three months, with the Journal-American one of the earliest strike targets of the Typographical Union. The Boston Record and the Evening American merged in 1961 as the Record-American and in 1964, the Baltimore News-Post became the Baltimore News-American.

In 1953 Hearst Magazines bought Sports Afield magazine, which it published until 1999 when it sold the journal to Robert E. Petersen. In 1958, Hearst's International News Service merged with E.W. Scripps' United Press, forming United Press International as a response to the growth of the Associated Press and Reuters. The following year Scripps-Howard's San Francisco News merged with Hearst's afternoon San Francisco Call-Bulletin. Also in 1959, Hearst acquired the paperback book publisher Avon Books.

In 1965, the Hearst Corporation began pursuing joint operating agreements (JOAs). It reached the first agreement with the DeYoung family, proprietors of the afternoon San Francisco Chronicle, which began to produce a joint Sunday edition with the Examiner. In turn, the Examiner became an evening publication, absorbing the News-Call-Bulletin. The following year, the Journal-American reached another JOA with another two landmark New York City papers: the New York Herald Tribune and Scripps-Howard's World-Telegram and Sun to form the New York World Journal Tribune (recalling the names of the city's mid-market dailies), which collapsed after only a few months.

The 1962 merger of the Herald-Express and Examiner in Los Angeles led to the termination of many journalists who began to stage a 10-year strike in 1967. The effects of the strike accelerated the pace of the company's demise, with the Herald Examiner ceasing publication November 2, 1989.

Newspaper shifts 
Hearst moved into hardcover publishing by acquiring Arbor House in 1978 and William Morrow and Company in 1981.

In 1982, the company sold the Boston Herald American — the result of the 1972 merger of Hearst's Record-American & Advertiser with the Herald-Traveler — to Rupert Murdoch's News Corporation, which renamed the paper as The Boston Herald, competing to this day with The Boston Globe.

In 1986, Hearst bought the Houston Chronicle and that same year closed the 213-year-old Baltimore News-American after a failed attempt to reach a JOA with A.S. Abell Company, the family who published The Baltimore Sun since its founding in 1837. Abell sold the paper several days later to the Times-Mirror syndicate of the Chandlers' Los Angeles Times, also competitor to the Los Angeles Herald-Examiner, which folded in 1989. In 1990, both King Features Entertainment and King Phoenix Entertainment were rebranded under the collective Hearst Entertainment umbrella. King Features Entertainment was renamed to Hearst Entertainment Distribution, while King Phoenix Entertainment was renamed to Hearst Entertainment Productions.

In 1993, Hearst closed the San Antonio Light after it purchased the rival San Antonio Express-News from Murdoch.

On November 8, 1990, Hearst Corporation acquired the remaining 20% stake of ESPN, Inc. from RJR Nabisco for a price estimated between $165 million and $175 million. The other 80% has been owned by The Walt Disney Company since 1996. Over the last 25 years, the ESPN investment is said to have accounted for at least 50% of total Hearst Corp profits and is worth at least $13 billion.

On July 31, 1996, Hearst and the Cisneros Group of Companies of Venezuela announced its plans to launch Locomotion, a Latin American animation cable television channel.

On March 27, 1997, Hearst Broadcasting announced that it would merge with Argyle Television Holdings II for $525 million, the merger was completed in August to form Hearst-Argyle Television (later renamed as Hearst Television in 2009).

In 1999, Hearst sold its Avon and Morrow book publishing activities to HarperCollins.

In 2000, the Hearst Corp. pulled another "switcheroo" by selling its flagship and "Monarch of the Dailies", the afternoon San Francisco Examiner, and acquiring the long-time competing, but now larger morning paper, San Francisco Chronicle from the Charles de Young family. The San Francisco Examiner is now published as a daily freesheet.

In December 2003, Marvel Entertainment acquired Cover Concepts from Hearst, to extend Marvel's demographic reach among public school children.

In 2009, A&E Networks acquired Lifetime Entertainment Services, with Hearst ownership increasing to 42%.

In 2010, Hearst acquired digital marketing agency iCrossing.

In 2011, Hearst absorbed more than 100 magazine titles from the Lagardère Group for more than $700 million and became a challenger of Time Inc ahead of Condé Nast. In December 2012, Hearst Corporation partnered again with NBCUniversal to launch Esquire Network.

On February 20, 2014, Hearst Magazines International appointed Gary Ellis to the new position, Chief Digital Officer. That December, DreamWorks Animation sold a 25% stake in AwesomenessTV for $81.25 million to Hearst.

In January 2017, Hearst announced that it had acquired a majority stake in Litton Entertainment. Its CEO, Dave Morgan, was a former employee of Hearst.

On January 23, 2017, Hearst announced that it had acquired the business operations of The Pioneer Group from fourth-generation family owners Jack and John Batdorff. The Pioneer Group was a Michigan-based communications network that circulates print and digital news to local communities across the state. In addition to daily newspapers, The Pioneer and Manistee News Advocate, Pioneer published three weekly papers and four local shopper publications, and operated a digital marketing services business. The acquisition brought Hearst Newspapers to publishing 19 daily and 61 weekly papers.

Other 2017 acquisitions include the New Haven Register and associated papers from Digital First Media, and the Alton, Illinois, Telegraph and Jacksonville, Illinois, Journal-Courier from Civitas Media.

In October 2017, Hearst announced it would acquire the magazine and book businesses of Rodale in Emmaus, Pennsylvania with some sources reporting the purchase price as about $225 million. The transaction was expected to close in January following government approvals.

Chief executive officers 
 In 1880, George Hearst entered the newspaper business, acquiring the San Francisco Daily Examiner.
 On March 4, 1887, he turned the Examiner over to his son, 23-year-old William Randolph Hearst, who was named editor and publisher. William Hearst died in 1951, at age 88.
 In 1951, Richard E. Berlin, who had served as president of the company since 1943, succeeded William Hearst as chief executive officer. Berlin retired in 1973. William Randolph Hearst Jr. claimed in 1991 that Berlin had suffered from Alzheimer's disease starting in the mid-1960s and that caused him to shut down several Hearst newspapers without just cause.
 From 1973 to 1975, Frank Massi, a longtime Hearst financial officer, served as president, during which time he carried out a financial reorganization followed by an expansion program in the late 1970s.
 From 1975 to 1979, John R. Miller was Hearst president and chief executive officer.
 Frank Bennack served as CEO and president from 1979 to 2002, when he became vice chairman, returning as CEO from 2008 to 2013, and remains executive vice chairman.
 Victor F. Ganzi served as president and CEO from 2002 to 2008.
 Steven Swartz has been president since 2012 and CEO since 2013.

Operating group heads 
 David Carey previously served as chairman and group head of the magazines. Debi Chirichella is that unit's president.
 Jeffrey M. Johnson became president of Hearst Newspapers in 2018 upon the promotion of Mark Aldam to executive vice president and chief operating officer of the parent company.

Assets 

A non-exhaustive list of its current properties and investments includes:

Magazines 

 Bicycling
 Billboard
 Car and Driver
 Cosmopolitan
 Country Living
 Dr. Oz THE GOOD LIFE
 ELLE (US and UK)
 Elle Decor
 Esquire
 Food Network Magazine
 Good Housekeeping
 Harper's Bazaar
 HGTV Magazine
 The Hollywood Reporter
 House Beautiful
 Men's Health
 Nat Mags
 O, The Oprah Magazine
 Popular Mechanics
 Prevention
 Red
 Redbook
 Road & Track
 Rodale's Organic Life
 Runner's World
 Seventeen (digital)
 Town & Country
 Veranda
 Woman's Day
 Women's Health
 Hearst Books (in partnership with Sterling Publishing)

Newspapers 
(alphabetical by state, then title)

 San Francisco Chronicle (San Francisco, California)
 The News-Times (Danbury, Connecticut)
 Greenwich Time (Greenwich, Connecticut)
 The Advocate (Stamford, Connecticut)
 Connecticut Post (Bridgeport, Connecticut)
 The Middletown Press (Middletown, Connecticut)
 New Haven Register (New Haven, Connecticut)
 The Hour (Norwalk, Connecticut)
 The Register Citizen (Torrington, Connecticut)
 The Telegraph (Alton, Illinois)
 Edwardsville Intelligencer (Edwardsville, Illinois)
 Jacksonville Journal-Courier (Jacksonville, Illinois)
 Huron Daily Tribune (Bad Axe, Michigan)
 Pioneer (Big Rapids, Michigan)
 Manistee News Advocate (Manistee, Michigan)
 Midland Daily News (Midland, Michigan)
 Times Union (Albany, New York)
 Beaumont Enterprise (Beaumont, Texas)
 Houston Chronicle  (Houston, Texas)
 Laredo Morning Times (Laredo, Texas)
 Midland Reporter-Telegram  (Midland, Texas)
 Plainview Daily Herald  (Plainview, Texas)
 San Antonio Express-News (San Antonio, Texas)
 Seattle Post-Intelligencer (Seattle, Washington)

Broadcasting 
 A+E Networks (owns 50%; shared joint venture with The Walt Disney Company)
 ESPN, Inc. (owns 20%; also shared with Disney, which owns the other 80%)
 CTV Specialty Television (owns 4% through its co-ownership of ESPN; shared joint venture with Bell Media, which owns 80%)
 Hearst Television (owns 100%; owner of 29 local television stations and two local radio stations/one translator)
 Hearst Media Production Group (owns 100%; provider of syndicated programming, mainly educational and informational programming, and contracted with four of the five major broadcast networks to provide their weekly educational output)

Internet 

 BestProducts.com
 Clevver
 Delish.com
 Digital Spy
 NetDoctor
 Hearst Interactive Media

Other 

 Black Book (National Auto Research)
 CAMP Systems (aircraft maintenance tracking)
 CDS Global
 First Databank
 Fitch Ratings
 Homecare Homebase
 iCrossing
 Jumpstart Automotive Group
 King Features Syndicate
 KUBRA
 LocalEdge (Buffalo, New York)
 Map of Medicine
 MCG Health
 ODG by Workloss Data Institute
 Zynx Health

Trustees of William Randolph Hearst's will 
Under William Randolph Hearst's will, a common board of thirteen trustees (its composition fixed at five family members and eight outsiders) administers the Hearst Foundation, the William Randolph Hearst Foundation, and the trust that owns (and selects the 26-member board of) the Hearst Corporation (immediate parent of Hearst Communications which shares the same officers). The foundations shared ownership until tax law changed to prevent this.

In 2009, it was estimated to be the largest private company managed by trustees in this way. As of 2017, the trustees are:

Family members 
 Anissa Bouadjakdji Balson, granddaughter of fifth son, David Whitmire Hearst Sr.
 Lisa Hearst Hagerman, granddaughter of third son, John Randolph Hearst Sr.
 George Randolph Hearst III, grandson of Hearst's eldest son, George Randolph Hearst Sr., and publisher of the Albany Times Union
 William Randolph Hearst III, son of second son, William Randolph Hearst Jr., and chairman of the board of the corporation
 Virginia Hearst Randt, daughter of late former chairman and fourth son, Randolph Apperson Hearst

Non-family members 
 James M. Asher, chief legal and development officer of the corporation
 David J. Barrett, former chief executive officer of Hearst Television, Inc.
 Frank A. Bennack Jr., former chief executive officer and executive vice chairman of the corporation
 John G. Conomikes, former executive of the corporation
 Gilbert C. Maurer, former chief operating officer of the corporation and former president of Hearst Magazines
 Mark F. Miller, former executive vice president of Hearst Magazines
 Mitchell Scherzer, senior vice president and chief financial officer of the corporation
 Steven R. Swartz, president and chief executive officer of the corporation

The trust dissolves when all family members alive at the time of Hearst's death in August 1951 have died.

See also 

 224 West 57th Street, building formerly occupied by Hearst Magazines
 Newsboys' strike of 1899

References

Further reading 
 Carlisle, Rodney. "The Foreign Policy Views of an Isolationist Press Lord: WR Hearst and the International Crisis, 1936–41." Journal of Contemporary History 9.3 (1974): 217–227.
 Nasaw, David. The Chief: The Life of William Randolph Hearst. (2000). Boston: Houghton Mifflin. ., a prominent scholarly biography.
 Pizzitola, Louis. Hearst over Hollywood: power, passion, and propaganda in the movies (Columbia UP, 2002).
 Procter, Ben H. William Randolph Hearst: Final Edition, 1911–1951. (Oxford UP 2007).
 Whyte, Kenneth. The uncrowned king: The sensational rise of William Randolph Hearst (2009).

External links 

 
 The Hearst Foundation, Inc.
 Hearst Global Solutions

 
Hearst family
Mass media companies established in 1887
Mass media companies based in New York City
Magazine publishing companies of the United States
Newspaper companies of the United States
Publishing companies based in New York City
Companies based in Manhattan
American companies established in 1887
Publishing companies established in 1887
1887 establishments in California
Privately held companies based in New York City
William Randolph Hearst
Family-owned companies of the United States